The Pandaruan River is a river that forms an international border on the island of Borneo, between Temburong, Brunei and Limbang, Malaysia. It is located at the river mouth of the Brunei Bay.

History 
On 4 May 1968, the 67 Gurkha Independent Field Squadron of the Queen's Gurkha Engineers built the first road alongside the river. 

A soil erosion destroyed the road connecting Kampong Belais and Buda-Buda in the early 2000s.

The Pandaruan Bridge which is also known as the Brunei–Malaysia Friendship Bridge, crosses the river linking Pandaruan in Sarawak, Malaysia, and Kampong Puni in Temburong, Brunei. The opening of the bridge on 8 December 2013 enabled the vehicular ferry service, which was then the only means for vehicles to cross the river, to be discontinued. 

Brunei and Malaysia have border crossing checkpoints at these locations. Vacation lodges were scheduled to be completed by the end of 2019.

See also
 Brunei–Malaysia relations
 List of rivers of Brunei

References
Renate Haller-Trost (1994). The Brunei–Malaysia Dispute over Territorial and Maritime Claims in International Law, (Maritime Briefing: Durham, UK)

Rivers of Brunei
Rivers of Sarawak
Brunei–Malaysia border
Temburong District
International rivers of Asia
Rivers of Malaysia